"Say OK" is a song recorded by American singer Vanessa Hudgens on her debut album V, which was written by Arnthor Birgisson and Savan Kotecha.

Background
At first, "Let Go" would have been the second single from the album, but this was replaced at the last minute for "Say OK". The song was released on the U.S. iTunes on January 12, 2007 and was played U.S. radio two months later, on March 27. In New Zealand the song was released on May 26, 2007 and in Europe on May 28, 2007.

The song was included on the CD Radio Disney Jams, Vol. 10, as well as the Family Jams CD Under Walt Disney Records. Vanessa released the song on the tour of High School Musical: The Concert and opening some shows on the tour the band The Cheetah Girls: The Party’s Just Begun Tour.

Music Video
The first version premiered on Disney Channel on January 12, 2007, after the series premiere of Cory in the House. It features Hudgens performing the song on the High School Musical: The Concert tour and also includes some behind-the-scenes footage shown in black-and-white. It was directed by Chris Applebaum, who directed her first music video, "Come Back to Me".

The second version and official music video premiered on March 13, 2007, on Disney Channel and March 26, 2007, on MTV's Total Request Live, it was directed by Darren Grant and features Hudgens with her then-boyfriend Zac Efron and some friends at a bowling alley playing a game of bowling. After they finish the game, they have dinner at the bowling alley. The video then shows Hudgens and Efron frolicking on a beach together and later, their friends arrive and join in on the fun. Solo shots of Hudgens both at the bowling alley and on the beach in Los Angeles, California, sitting on a swing and merry-go-round are interspersed throughout the video.

Track listing

Digital download
 "Say OK" – 3:32

CD Single
 "Say OK" [Single Mix] – 3:32
 "Say OK" [Albert Castillo Extended Remix] – 6:01
 "Say OK" [Albert Castillo Remix] – 3:25

Credits and personnel 

 Vanessa Hudgens – lead vocals
 Arnthor Birgisson – keyboards, producer, programming, songwriting
 Savan Kotecha – songwriting
 Brian Reeves – engineer
 Jeanette Ohlsson – background vocals
Credits are adapted from the V album liner notes.

Chart performance
The song debuted on the Billboard Hot 100 chart of February 17, 2007, at number 67 and peaked at number 61 the following week.

In Brazil, the song was the 19th most played international song of 2007 in the radios, according to Crowley Broadcast Analysis.

Charts

Weekly charts

External links

References 

2007 singles
Vanessa Hudgens songs
Music videos directed by Chris Applebaum
Music videos directed by Darren Grant
Songs written by Savan Kotecha
Songs written by Arnthor Birgisson
Hollywood Records singles
2006 songs